The Renault Vivasix was a full-size car manufactured by the French car company Renault between 1926 and 1930. In 1930 the Vivasix was replaced by the Vivastella.

Details and evolutions

In 1927 Renault created two new models, one luxury and expensive called "Type RA" and a second, simpler model called "Type PG". The two models together were known as the Vivasix. The Vivasix model was one of the larger cars produced by Renault in that period.

The "Type RA" and the "Type PG" were replaced by a new luxury car called the Renault Vivastella between 1928 and 1929.

Types

PG1 from 1926 to 1929
PG3 only 1930

Vivasix
Cars introduced in 1926